J. Campbell was an English footballer who played in the Football League for Burnley.

References

Year of birth unknown
Date of death unknown
English footballers
Burnley F.C. players
English Football League players
Association football forwards